The West Essex Regional School District is a regional public school district serving students in seventh through twelfth grade from Essex Fells, Fairfield, North Caldwell and Roseland, four municipalities in western Essex County, New Jersey, United States.

As of the 2018–19 school year, the district, comprised of two schools, had an enrollment of 1,716 students and 151.6 classroom teachers (on an FTE basis), for a student–teacher ratio of 11.3:1.

The district is classified by the New Jersey Department of Education as being in District Factor Group "I", the second-highest of eight groupings. District Factor Groups organize districts statewide to allow comparison by common socioeconomic characteristics of the local districts. From lowest socioeconomic status to highest, the categories are A, B, CD, DE, FG, GH, I and J.

West Essex Regional is accredited by the New Jersey Department of Education and the Middle States Association of Colleges and Schools.

Awards, recognition and rankings
The school was the 16th-ranked public high school in New Jersey out of 328 schools statewide in New Jersey Monthly magazine's September 2012 cover story on the state's "Top Public High Schools", after being ranked 36th in 2010 out of 322 schools listed. The magazine ranked the school 48th in 2008 out of 316 schools.

Schools 
Schools in the district (with 2018–19 enrollment data from the National Center for Education Statistics) are:
West Essex Middle School with 564 students in grades 7-8
Gina Donlevie, Principal
Lisa Tamburri, Assistant Principal
West Essex High School with 1,123 students in grades 9-12
Caesar Diliberto, Principal
Juliann Hoebee, Assistant Principal
Kimberly R. Westervelt, Assistant Principal

Administration
Members of the district administration are:
Damion Macioci, Superintendent 
Melissa Kida, Business Administrator / Board Secretary

Board of education
The district's board of education, comprised of nine members, sets policy and oversees the fiscal and educational operation of the district through its administration. As a Type II school district, the board's trustees are elected directly by voters to serve three-year terms of office on a staggered basis, with three seats up for election each year held (since 2012) as part of the November general election. The board appoints a superintendent to oversee the day-to-day operation of the district. Seats on the board of education are allocated based on the population of the constituent municipalities, with three seats assigned to Fairfield, three to North Caldwell, two to Roseland and one to Essex Fells.

References

External links 
West Essex Regional School District

School Data for the West Essex Regional School District, National Center for Education Statistics

Essex Fells, New Jersey
Fairfield Township, Essex County, New Jersey
North Caldwell, New Jersey
Roseland
New Jersey District Factor Group I
School districts in Essex County, New Jersey
The Caldwells, New Jersey